Karl Robert Indermitte (5 April 1883 Mäo Parish (now Paide), Jerwen County – 10 May 1945 Paide Parish, Järva County) was an Estonian politician. He was a member of II Riigikogu.

References

1883 births
1945 deaths
People from Paide
People from Kreis Jerwen
Farmers' Assemblies politicians
Members of the Riigikogu, 1923–1926
Estonian military personnel of the Estonian War of Independence